Tanet or Tannet is a surname.  The French surname Tanet could be toponymic or a sobriquet in origin. Spelling variations of this family name include: Tanat, Tannat, Tanet, Tanett, Tanatt, Tannatt, or even Danet due to apophony, and many more. In the case of 'Tanet' several interpretations are possible. The surname can be traced back to the Old Breton "tanet" meaning "aflame", that could be a nickname for a nervous or irritated trait or as a corruption of the Common Celtic 'tan-arth' "high fire", derived from the place where the original bearer once resided, suggesting in this case "one who dwelt on the beacon or lighthouse".

Tanet could also be a corruption of the toponymic tanouët meaning oak grove (tannoed, which underwent a consonant mutation to tann-eto in Common Brittonic), and has the same root as Gaulish tanno- (oak tree), Latin tannum (oak bark) used in the tanning of leather, Old High German tanna (oak, fir, akin) from proto-Germanic tan, (needle, what sticks out) and Breton tann (oak tree). In Old French speaking regions it also meant brown cloth or the color of the tan and designated the manufacturer.

This surname is now spread all over France with concentrations in Brittany and Aquitaine, though the Aquitanian origin may differ. A toponymic term tannet is also found in Savoie, Switzerland, Alpes-Maritimes:  tanne, tune, tannaz, taverno or tuna (cave, hole, den or vault). Tanné is also commonly found in Finistère.

A similar surname is also found in Irish sept of Ó Tanaidhe (Tanny, Tannay, Tanney, Tanie, Taney), part of the Clan Drugain (Tanaide, Tanaidhe, Tanaí (TAWN-ee/TAHN ee) meaning slender, subtle.

People
People with the name include:
 Chantal Tanet, French writer and translator from Périgord
 Marie-Thérèse Tanet, Wife of Jean-Baptiste de Sénac and mother of Gabriel Sénac de Meilhan
 Louison Tanet, French wildwater canoeist
 Abbé Taneth of Locminé, Breton monk who was forced to flee after the Saint-Sauveur abbay in Moréac was destroyed by Normans around 919, in 927 he settled in Berry.
 Tannet of Pagan (859–904), king of Pagan dynasty of Burma
 Steve Tannet, English musician and producer
 Claire Tannett, Canadian figure skater

Places 
Places with the name include:
Le Tanet
Tanet, a lieu-dit in Saint-Aubin-de-Branne
Tanet, a lieu-dit in Plœuc-sur-Lié
Tanet, a lieu-dit in Saint-Georges-sur-Renon
Le Tannet, a lieu-dit in Saint-James and Saint-Senier-de-Beuvron
Le Tannet, a lieu-dit in Saint-Pierre-sur-Dives
Le Tannet, a lieu-dit in Brée
village of Crec'h-Tanet now a lieu-dit was incorporated partly to Lannion by the order of September 11, 1822. From the Breton krec'h (height, mound) and tanet (lit, burned).
 Hameau de La Ville Tanet, lieu-dit in Le Hinglé.
 La Ville Tanet, lieu-dit in Landéhen.
 La Ville Tanet, lieu-dit in Plédéliac.
 La Ville Tanet, lieu-dit in Saint-Pôtan.
Les Villes Tanets, a lieu-dit in Yffiniac
Le Tanouët, a lieu-dit in Boqueho and Plouvara
Le Dannoët, a lieu-dit in Canihuel and Saint-Nicolas-du-Pélem
Le Dannoët, a lieu-dit in Lanrivain

See also 
Thanet: the Historia Brittonum, written in Wales in the 9th century, states that "Tanet" was the name used for the island by the legendary Anglo-Saxons Hengist and Horsa
Afon Tanat
Tanette
772 Tanete, an asteroid named after the village of Tanete, Bulukumba Regency, Sulawesi
 "Tanet",  a Yemeni Arabic name for Halothamnus bottae''.
Tannat, a red wine grape

References

External links

Tanet family trees entries on Geneanet
Distribution of the surname Tanet in France
Distribution of the surname Danet in France
Tanet on locatemyname.com

Breton-language surnames
Surnames of French origin